Shmuel Bornsztain (also Borenstein or Bernstein) may refer to:
Shmuel Bornsztain, second Sochatchover Rebbe (1856–1926), author of Shem Mishmuel
Shmuel Bornsztain, sixth Sochatchover Rebbe (born 1961)